A crag (sometimes spelled cragg, or in Scotland craig) is a rocky hill or mountain, generally isolated from other high ground.

Origin 
Crags are formed when a glacier or ice sheet passes over an area that contains a particularly resistant rock formation (often granite, a volcanic plug or some other volcanic structure). The force of the glacier erodes the surrounding softer material, leaving the rocky block protruding from the surrounding terrain. Frequently the crag serves as a partial shelter to softer material in the wake of the glacier, which remains as a gradual fan or ridge forming a tapered ramp (called the tail) up the leeward side of the crag.

In older examples, or those latterly surrounded by the sea, the tail is often missing, having been removed by post-glacial erosion.

Examples 
Examples of crag and tail formations include:
 Castle Rock (the crag, site of Edinburgh Castle) and the Royal Mile (the tail), in Edinburgh, Scotland
 Salisbury Crags and Arthur's Seat, in Edinburgh
 North Berwick Law, in North Berwick, Scotland
 Three in or near Stirling, Scotland, including the rock on which Stirling Castle stands
 "Scrabo Hill" in Newtownards, Northern Ireland, site of the Scrabo Tower
 Ailsa Craig, famous for curling stone mining
 Crag and tail features have been identified on the Amundsen Sea continental shelf off West Antarctica.

See also
 Drumlin
 Roche moutonnée

References

 Holmes, Arthur, Principles of Physical Geology, Halsted, 1978, 3rd ed., pp 421 – 422 

Glaciology
Glacial landforms
Erosion landforms
Mountains